Basic lead phosphite is an inorganic compound with the proposed composition Pb3O(OH)2(HPO3).  The compound contains the phosphite anion, which provides the reducing properties associated with the application of this material.

It is widely used as a stabilizer for chlorine-containing polymers, especially polyvinylchloride.  Other lead phosphites are known, including normal lead phosphite, PbHPO3, although the basic salt is especially effective.

References

Phosphites
Inorganic phosphorus compounds
Lead(II) compounds